Kluyvera cryocrescens is a bacterium, the type species of its genus. It is Gram-negative, rod-shaped and motile with peritrichous flagella.

References

Further reading
Carter, J. Elliot, and Tara N. Evans. "Clinically Significant Kluyvera Infections A Report of Seven Cases." American Journal of Clinical Pathology 123.3 (2005): 334–338.
Ortega, Calvo M., et al. "[Kluyvera cryocrescens: a positive urine culture in a young girl with persistent proteinuria]." Actas urologicas espanolas 23.6 (1999): 528–531.

GIL D DE, M. O. N. I. C. A., et al. "Bacteremia por Kluyvera cryocrescens: Reporte de dos casos clínicos." Revista chilena de infectología 18.1 (2001): 72–74.

External links

LPSN
Type strain of Kluyvera cryocrescens at BacDive -  the Bacterial Diversity Metadatabase

Enterobacteriaceae
Gram-negative bacteria
Bacteria described in 1981